The Roman Catholic Diocese of Tianguá is a diocese located in the city of Tianguá in the Ecclesiastical province of Fortaleza in Brazil.

History
 March 13, 1971: Established as Diocese of Tianguá from the Diocese of Sobral

Leadership
 Bishops of Tianguá (Roman rite), in reverse chronological order
 Bishop Francisco Edimilson Neves Ferreira (2017.02.15 - present)
 Bishop Francisco Javier Hernández Arnedo, O.A.R. (1991.03.06 – 2017.02.15)
 Bishop Timóteo Francisco Nemésio Pereira Cordeiro, O.F.M. Cap. (1971.03.13 – 1990.03.20)

References
 GCatholic.org
 Catholic Hierarchy

External links
  

Christian organizations established in 1971
Roman Catholic dioceses and prelatures established in the 20th century
Roman Catholic dioceses in Brazil
Roman Catholic Ecclesiastical Province of Fortaleza